The Men's Pursuit competition of the Vancouver 2010 Paralympics is held at Whistler Olympic Park in Whistler, British Columbia. The competition is scheduled for Saturday, March 13.

2 x 3 km Visually Impaired

In the biathlon 2 x 3 km visually impaired, the athlete with a visual impairment has a sighted guide. The two skiers are considered a team, and dual medals are awarded.

2 x 2.4 km Sitting

Standing

See also
Biathlon at the 2010 Winter Olympics – Men's pursuit

References

External links
2010 Winter Plympics schedule and results, at the official website of the 2010 Winter Paralympics in Vancouver

Biathlon at the 2010 Winter Paralympics
Winter Paralympics